Loxocrambus awemensis is a moth in the family Crambidae. It was described by James Halliday McDunnough in 1929. It is found in North America, where it has been recorded from Manitoba, Alberta, Michigan and Ontario. The habitat consists of sand dunes.

The wingspan is 22–25 mm. Adults are on wing in July and August.

Larvae have been reared from a pupa in a sand tube near dune grasses.

References

Crambini
Moths described in 1929
Moths of North America